This is a list of monuments that are classified by the Moroccan ministry of culture around Taroudant.

Monuments and sites in Taroudant

|}

References 

Taroudant